Tropidodipsas is a genus of New World snakes of the family Colubridae.

Geographic range
Species of the genus Tropidodipsas are found in Mexico and Central America.

Species
Ten species are recognized as being valid.
Tropidodipsas fasciata Günther, 1858
Tropidodipsas fischeri Boulenger, 1894
Tropidodipsas guerreroensis Taylor, 1939 – Guerrero snail sucker
Tropidodipsas papavericola Grünwald, Toribio-Jiménez, Montaño-Ruvalcaba, Franz-Chávez, Peñaloza-Montaño, Barrera-Nava, J.M. Jones, C.M. Rodriguez, I. Hughes, Strickland & Reyes-Velasco, 2021
Tropidodipsas philippii (Jan, 1863)
Tropidodipsas repleta H.M. Smith, Lemos-Espinal, Hartman & Chiszar, 2005
Tropidodipsas tricolor Grünwald, Toribio-Jiménez, Montaño-Ruvalcaba, Franz-Chávez, Peñaloza-Montaño, Barrera-Nava, J.M. Jones, C.M. Rodriguez, I.M. Hughes, Strickland & Reyes-Velasco, 2021
Tropidodipsas zweifeli Liner & Wilson, 1970

Etymology
The specific name, fischeri, is in honor of German herpetologist Johann Gustav Fischer.

The specific name, philippii, is in honor of German-Chilean zoologist Rodolfo Amando Philippi.

The specific name, zweifeli, is in honor of American herpetologist Richard G. Zweifel.

References

Further reading
Beolens, Bo; Watkins, Michael; Grayson, Michael (2011). The Eponym Dictionary of Reptiles. Baltimore: Johns Hopkins University Press. xiii + 296 pp. .
Boulenger GA (1894). Catalogue of the Snakes in the British Museum (Natural History). Volume II., Containing the Conclusion of the Colubridæ Aglyphæ. London: Trustees of the British Museum (Natural History). (Taylor and Francis, printers). xi + 382 pp. + Plates I-XX. (Genus Tropidodipsas, p. 294; T. annulifera, new species, p. 297 + Plate XIV, figure 1; T. fasciata, p. 295; T. fischeri, p. 296; T. philippii, p. 295; T. sartorii, pp. 296–297). 
Günther A (1858). Catalogue of the Colubrine Snakes in the Collection of the British Museum. London: Trustees of the British Museum. (Taylor and Francis, printers). xvi + 281 pp. (Tropidodipsas, new genus, pp. 180–181).

Tropidodipsas
Snake genera
Taxa named by Albert Günther